Dittmer is an unincorporated community in western Jefferson County, Missouri, United States. It is located about 14 miles northwest of Hillsboro on Route 30. 

The community's namesake is William Dittmer, an early postmaster who established a post office called Dittmer's Store in 1870. An 1891 railroad map calls the community "Dittmer's Store." It was officially named Dittmer in 1899. 

Today, Dittmer is home to the Vianney Renewal Center, a treatment center for Catholic clergy with sexual or other disorders.

References

Unincorporated communities in Jefferson County, Missouri
Unincorporated communities in Missouri